Fernando de Andrade de las Mariñas (1477 in Pontedeume – 1542), First Count of Andrade and Second of Vilalba, Lord of Pontedeume and Ferrol, was a Galician (Spanish) nobleman and important military commander during the Italian Wars. He defeated the French troops of Bérault Stuart d'Aubigny at the Battle of Seminara (1503) in the context of the Second Italian War.

References

External links
Grandes de España 

1477 births
1549 deaths
Counts of Spain
Military leaders of the Italian Wars
House of Andrade